Horka I is a municipality and village in Kutná Hora District in the Central Bohemian Region of the Czech Republic. It has about 400 inhabitants.

The Roman numeral in the name serves to distinguish it from the nearby municipality of the same name, Horka II.

Administrative parts
Villages of Borek and Svobodná Ves are administrative parts of Horka I.

Gallery

References

Villages in Kutná Hora District